Jana Assi (born 2 July 1999) is a Lebanese former footballer who played as a forward.

Club career 
Assi joined Safa ahead of the 2019–20 Lebanese Women's Football League, scoring five goals. In summer 2020, she left Safa as a result of her decision to leave Lebanon. Assi cited the economic crisis in the country as the reason for her departure.

Personal life 
Assi holds French citizenship. After graduating in Lebanon, she left the country to move to France in 2020.

Honours 
Safa
 Lebanese Women's Football League: 2020–21

See also
 List of Lebanon women's international footballers

References

External links

 

1999 births
Living people
Footballers from Beirut
Lebanese women's footballers
Lebanese women's futsal players
Women's association football forwards
Stars Association for Sports players
Safa WFC players
Lebanese Women's Football League players
Lebanon women's international footballers
Lebanese emigrants to France
21st-century Lebanese women